Otto Armstrong (January 4, 1880 — June 23, 1960) was an American politician and farmer from Wapello County, Iowa who served in the Iowa House of Representatives from 1953 to 1955, representing the 18th legislative district of Iowa as a Republican in the 55th Iowa General Assembly.

Early life and education
Otto Armstrong was born in Macon County, Missouri on January 4, 1880, near the town of Atlanta, Missouri. He attended local schools and graduated from Ottumwa Commercial College. He served in the Spanish-American War.

Career
Armstrong was elected to a single term in the Iowa House of Representatives. He served from 1953 to 1955, representing the 18th legislative district of Iowa as a Republican in the 55th Iowa General Assembly.

In 1953, Armstrong was serving on the following standing committees.
Agriculture 2
Compensation of Public Officers
Conservation, Drainage and Flood Control
Judiciary 2
Military Affairs
Public Utilities
Armstrong was a chairman of the Wapello County Ration Board. He was also a chairman of the Wapello County Soldiers Relief Commission for 20 years.

Personal life
Armstrong married Fairfield, Iowa native Katherine Casada in 1903, with whom he raised three children. Casada died in 1941; Armstrong married Clare Hale the following year. They farmed together near Ottumwa, Iowa.

Armstrong died at the age of 80 in Fort Lauderdale, Florida on June 23, 1960.

Notes

References

External links
Official page at the Iowa General Assembly

1880 births
1960 deaths
20th-century American politicians
Republican Party members of the Iowa House of Representatives
Farmers from Iowa
American military personnel of the Spanish–American War
People from Ottumwa, Iowa
People from Macon County, Missouri